Air Pocket was a jazz fusion band founded by the Fowler brothers.

Their debut album was arranged by Oliver Nelson.   It was released on LP in 1976 and CD in 2002, both by East Wind.

Discography
1976: Fly On (East Wind)
1985: Hunter
1988: Breakfast for Dinosaurs

Personnel
Walt Fowler - trumpet, miraphon
Bruce Fowler - trombone
Steve Fowler - alto saxophone, flute
Albert Wing - soprano saxophone, tenor saxophone
Mike Miller - guitar
Stu Goldberg - piano, electric piano, mini-moog, clavinet
Ed Fowler - electric bass
Tom Fowler - electric bass
Chester Thompson - drums

References

External links
Fly On 
Fowler Brothers at Progarchives.com
Breakfast for Dinosaurs at Discogs

American jazz ensembles
Jazz fusion ensembles